This is a list of seasons completed by the Vanderbilt Commodores college football team since its inception in 1890.

Seasons

References

Vanderbilt
Vanderbilt Commodores football seasons